Kubagushevo (Qobağoş) is a rural locality (a village) in Mindyaksky Selsoviet, Uchalinsky District, Bashkortostan, Russia. The population was 377 as of 2010. There are 12 streets.

Geography 
Kubagushevo is located 77 km southwest of Uchaly (the district's administrative centre) by road. Kazakkulovo is the nearest rural locality.

References 

Rural localities in Uchalinsky District